Pengiran Mohammad Fakharrazi bin Pengiran Haji Hassan (born 15 July 1989), sometimes erroneously referred to as Ak Fakharazzi is a Bruneian professional footballer who plays as a right-sided defender or midfielder for DPMM FC and the Brunei national team.

Club career
Fakharrazi was a youth player at IKLS FC, a club that was based in Kampong Ayer. He moved to Prince Mateen owned club AM Gunners who were chasing promotion to the Brunei Premier League I in 2008, and played there for the next 2 years. He was registered to MS ABDB in 2010, but was soon snapped up by DPMM FC who were preparing to return to the S.League in 2012. He made his debut in a 1–3 away victory over Balestier Khalsa on 10 May. He made nine substitute appearances in his first season as DPMM won the 2009 Singapore League Cup and placed second in the league.

For the next couple of seasons, Fakharrazi made a handful of appearances without cementing a regular place in the team due to the form of Aminuddin Zakwan Tahir and later Helmi Zambin in his preferred right-back spot. Midway through a disastrous campaign in 2017, he swapped teams with Haizul Rani Metusin and returned to MS ABDB where he won the domestic league title, making 16 appearances for the armymen and scoring once.

Fakharrazi returned to the fold with DPMM in 2018 under the reign of Rene Weber. The following year, he made 10 league starts under Adrian Pennock, scoring the decisive fifth goal against Hougang United in a 5–4 victory at home on 29 September, which helped DPMM clinch the Singapore Premier League title. Despite his heroics, he was reassigned to the B team playing in the Brunei Super League in the short-lived 2020 season for DPMM. The following year, he was reinstated into the first team, scoring in a 15–0 victory over Rimba Star FC on 4 July.

On 4 December 2022, Fakharrazi gained his first Brunei FA Cup medal after DPMM won 2–1 against Kasuka FC in the final of the 2022 Brunei FA Cup.

International career
Fakharrazi was a squad member for the 2011 edition of the SEA Games football tournament with the Brunei under-23s.

Fakharrazi featured for the Wasps at the 2012 AFF Suzuki Cup qualifying round in the final fixture against Timor-Leste, in a 2–1 victory on 13 October which also eliminated the Timorese from qualifying for the tournament. Two years later he was ever-present at right midfield under Steve Kean at the 2014 AFF Suzuki Cup qualification, scoring twice in as many games against Timor-Leste and hosts Laos. Despite his goals, Brunei finished bottom of their group without earning a point, a marked decline from the previous campaign. 

Entering the FIFA World Cup for the first time in 12 years, Fakharrazi was selected for the 2018 World Cup qualification first round matches against Chinese Taipei in March 2015. He started both games when after providing the cross for Adi Said's goal in a promising 0–1 victory in Kaohsiung, he was taken off injured early in the second leg, and subsequently his team faltered to a 0–2 reverse which eliminated them from the World Cup in Russia.

Fakharrazi's next international tournament was the 2016 AFF Championship qualification matches held in Cambodia that October. He started the first match in a 2–1 victory over Timor-Leste, but was also on the field in a 0–3 defeat to the hosts. A month later, he also made two appearances from the starting lineup at the 2016 AFC Solidarity Cup held in Kuching, Malaysia.

After barely getting any playing time for his club in 2018, his resurgence under Adrian Pennock earned him a callup for the 2022 World Cup qualification matches against Mongolia in June 2019, but he declined due to unspecified reasons. He made appearances from the start at friendly games against Laos, Malaysia and the Maldives in 2022.

In November 2022, Fakharazzi played the first match against Timor-Leste at the 2022 AFF Mitsubishi Electric Cup qualifying matches held in Bandar Seri Begawan. The Wasps won the match 6–2 which greatly helped the team to qualify for the tournament proper. The following month, Fakharrazi made three out of four appearances for Brunei, registering losses in all of them.

International goals
Scores and results list Brunei goal tally first.

Honours

Team
AM Gunners
 Brunei Premier League II: 2008

Brunei DPMM FC
 S.League: 2012 Runner-Up, 2014 Runner-Up, 2015
 Singapore Premier League: 2019
 Singapore League Cup (2): 2012, 2014
 Brunei FA Cup: 2022

MS ABDB
 Brunei Super League: 2017–18

References

External links
 
 

1989 births
Living people
Association football midfielders
Bruneian footballers
Brunei international footballers
DPMM FC players
MS ABDB players
Competitors at the 2011 Southeast Asian Games
Competitors at the 2013 Southeast Asian Games
Southeast Asian Games competitors for Brunei